The 2018 Dutch Basketball Supercup was the 7th edition of the Dutch Basketball Supercup. The game was played in the MartiniPlaza in Groningen.

The game featured Donar, the defending champions of the Dutch Basketball League, and ZZ Leiden, the runner-up of the 2017–18 NBB Cup.

Donar won the game 74–69, winning its record third Supercup. It was the debut game for Rolf Franke as head coach of Leiden.

Match details

References

Dutch Basketball Supercup
Supercup